Zeigler is a city in Franklin County, Illinois, United States. The population was 1,801 at the 2010 census. The current mayor is Dennis Mitchell.

History

Zeigler incorporated in 1914 and was named for Levi Zeigler Leiter, the father of Joseph Leiter, the founder of the Zeigler Coal Company.

Geography
Zeigler is located in southwestern Franklin County at  (37.899856, -89.053429). Illinois Route 149 passes through the center of town, leading east  to West Frankfort and west  to Royalton. Illinois Route 148 follows the western border of Zeigler, leading north  to Christopher and south  to Herrin. The city is laid out in the shape of a wagon wheel, with the post office, library, and several shops concentrated around a circular park at the center, and streets radiating out from the center.

Demographics

As of the census of 2000, there were 1,669 people, 712 households, and 439 families residing in the city. The racial makeup of the city was 98.86% White, 0.18% African American, 0.06% Native American, 0.12% Asian, and 0.78% from two or more races. Hispanic or Latino of any race were 0.48% of the population.

There were 712 households, out of which 27.7% had children under the age of 18 living with them, 47.1% were married couples living together, 10.5% had a female householder with no husband present, and 38.3% were non-families. 34.7% of all households were made up of individuals, and 19.2% had someone living alone who was 65 years of age or older.  The average household size was 2.28 and the average family size was 2.94.

In the city, the population was spread out, with 22.5% under the age of 18, 8.5% from 18 to 24, 28.2% from 25 to 44, 22.3% from 45 to 64, and 18.6% who were 65 years of age or older.  The median age was 39 years. For every 100 females, there were 92.9 males.  For every 100 females age 18 and over, there were 89.2 males.

The median income for a household in the city was $22,344, and the median income for a family was $30,776. Males had a median income of $27,721 versus $17,500 for females. The per capita income for the city was $13,781.  About 13.7% of families and 17.5% of the population were below the poverty line, including 27.1% of those under age 18 and 7.6% of those age 65 or over.

Notable people 

 Nick Holonyak, invented the first practically useful visible LED in 1962; born in Zeigler
 Babe Martin, outfielder and catcher for the St. Louis Browns and Boston Red Sox; grew up in Zeigler
 Mike Milosevich, shortstop for the New York Yankees; born in Zeigler

References

External links

 City of Zeigler official website

Cities in Franklin County, Illinois
Cities in Illinois
Populated places in Southern Illinois
Sundown towns in Illinois